How to Drown Dr. Mracek, the Lawyer is a Czechoslovak comedy film directed by Václav Vorlíček. It was released in 1974.

Plot
The plot follows a family of water spirits (vodníci) who live in a river and enter through a house next to the river. As part of a regular inspection, the house is found to have mold and water damage, and they must find a way to drown the lawyer foreseeing the case of the house, otherwise they will have nowhere to live and be discovered.

Cast
 Jaromír Hanzlík - Dr. Jindřich Mráček
 Libuše Šafránková - Jana Vodičková
 František Filipovský - Bertík
 Miloš Kopecký - Mr. Wassermann
 Vladimír Menšík - Karel
 Zdeněk Řehoř - Alois
 Stella Zázvorková - Doc. Mráčková
 Eva Trejtnarová - Polly Wassermann
 Čestmír Řanda - Albert Bach
 Míla Myslíková - Matilda Wassermann
 Vlastimil Hašek - Honza
 Jiří Hrzán - Tomáš
 Miroslav Masopust - Rolf
 Gabriela Wilhelmová - Růženka
 Milena Steinmasslová - Krista

External links
 

1970s fantasy comedy films
1974 films
Czechoslovak fantasy films
Films directed by Václav Vorlíček
Czech fantasy comedy films
1974 comedy films
Films about fairies and sprites
1970s Czech films